Kusheh-ye Qaleh Rashid Khan (also Romanized as Kūsheh-ye Qal‘eh Rashīd Khān) is a village in Taftan-e Jonubi Rural District, Nukabad District, Khash County, Sistan and Baluchestan Province, Iran. At the 2006 census, its population was 219, in 51 families.

References 

Populated places in Khash County